Stookey is a surname. Notable people with the surname include:

 Bob Stookey, a fictional character from the comic book series The Walking Dead and the television series of the same name
 Kris Stookey (born 1969), American yacht racer
 Nathaniel Stookey (born 1970), Americancomposer
 Paul Stookey (born 1937), American folk singer-songwriter
 S. Donald Stookey (1915–2014), American engineer and the creator of CorningWare

See also
 Stookey Township
 Stooky

English-language surnames
Surnames of English origin